The Battle of Breadfield was the most tremendous conflict fought in Transylvania up to that time in the Ottoman–Hungarian Wars, taking place on October 13, 1479, on the Breadfield near the Saxon village of Alkenyér (also Zsibód) next to the river Maros (Mureș). The Hungarian army was led by Pál Kinizsi, István Báthory, Vuk Branković, and Basarab Laiotă cel Bătrân.

The result of the battle was an important victory for the Kingdom of Hungary and the Serbian Despotate.

Background
From his ascendence to the Hungarian throne in 1458, King Matthias fought with the Turks, and in 1463, he occupied the northern parts of Bosnia. However, this was not a full-scale war.

Turkish marauders attacked Transylvania and Vojvodina several times between 1474 and 1475. The attacks led to the depopulation of some areas with a number of villages abandoned by their inhabitants.

After the Ottoman–Venetian War (1463–79) in the spring of 1479, a major Ottoman army convened under Szendrő (today Smederevo, Serbia), above all, Akıncıs. When King Matthias was alerted, in the Edict of Gragnica (July 11), he ordered Stephen V Báthory, the Voivode of Transylvania and his general Pál Kinizsi to mobilize.

The Ottoman army entered Transylvania on October 9, near Kelnek (Câlnic), led by Ali Koca Bey. The Akıncıs attacked a few villages, homesteads, and market towns, taking a number of Hungarians, Vlachs, and Saxons captive. On October 13, Koca Bey set up his camp in the Breadfield (Kenyérmező), near Zsibót. Koca Bey was obliged into the campaign by the insistence of Basarab cel Tânăr, a Wallachian prince, who himself brought 1,000–2,000 infantry to the cause.

The Turks continued pillaging and taking prisoners, while Báthory and Kinizsi made preparations to set forth against the Turks.

The Hungarian and the Ottoman armies
The numerical strength of the Ottoman army is under debate; one estimate judged them to be 60,000, while Hungarian sources placed them closer to 30,000. Jan Długosz, the famous Polish chronicler, estimated the Ottoman forces to have been 100,000 men-at-arms, but Matthias Corvinus estimated in his letters that there were 43–45,000 Ottoman and Wallachian soldiers. A more probable number for Ottoman forces was between 6-20 thousand soldiers, and 1,000-2,000 Wallachians. The Ottoman army was almost entirely made up of Akıncıs, Rumelian Spakhs, and Azaps, with some Janissaries and possibly some cannon. The Ottoman enterprise was not a full-fledged war effort, but rather a very substantial raiding one - the largest expedition Transylvania encountered during a century's worth of Hungarian-Turkish conflicts.

Kinizsi's army consisted of Hungarian, Szekler, Serbian, Transylvanian Saxon forces, and some Vlach volunteers. The latter were commanded by Basarab Laiotă "cel Bătrân", lit. "the Elder", quondam ruler of Wallachia and archrival to Basarab "cel Tânăr", lit. "the Younger". Accordingly, the younger Basarab insisted on equality with the older, with only one being tenable to the Wallachian throne. The combined Christian forces totalled approximated 12,000 to 15,000 men. In the judgement of some, Poles, Moldavians, Russians, Lithuanians, Germans, and Bohemians were privy in part to the battle, but this is rather difficult to substantiate.

The battle
On October 9 the Turkish army entered Hungary and began raiding. Báthory waited until the Turks got exhausted in marching and raiding, and once the Ottomans had collected too much loot to move fast enough, he attacked them on October 13.

Both armies were composed of three columns. The right flank of the Hungarian army was led by Kinizsi, the left was the Serbian light cavalry under Vuk Grgurević and Demetrius Jakšić with the Saxons and Báthory's forces in the center. On the Ottoman side, Koca Bey took the left flank, Isa Bey the center, and Malkoch Oglu the right flank.

The battle commenced in the afternoon. Báthory fell from his horse and the Ottomans nearly captured him, but a nobleman called Antal Nagy whisked the voivode away. Having joined battle, the Ottomans were in ascendancy early on, but Kinizsi charged against the Turks with the Hungarian heavy cavalry and 900 Serbs under Jakšić assisted by "numerous courtiers of the king". Ali Bey was forced to retreat. Kinizsi moved laterally to vigorously smash the Turkish center and before long Isa Bey also withdrew. The few Turks who survived the massacre fled into the mountains, where the majority were killed by the local men. The hero of the battle was Pál Kinizsi, the legendary Hungarian general and a man of Herculean strength in the service of Matthias Corvinus' Black Army of Hungary.

Aftermath
Ottoman casualties were extremely high with several thousand men killed, among them Malkoçoğlu and Isa Bey along with two beys and a thousand of their Wallachian allies. Hungarian forces lost approximately 3,000 men in the battle. A few prisoners were liberated and their ransom was immense.

In 1480 Kinizsi raided Serbia and several times defeated Ali Koca Bey. The battle of Breadfield was a great psychological victory for the Hungarians, and as a result the Ottoman Turks did not attack southern Hungary and Transylvania for many years thereafter.

See also
 List of battles 1301–1600
 Breadfield

References

Bibliography

External links
 Ferenc Szakály Ferenc and Pál Fodor: The Battle of Breadfiled, October 13 1479. Military notice, 111. class (1998.) 2.numb. 
 Battle of Breadfield, October 13 1479.  

1479 in Europe
Battles of the Ottoman–Hungarian Wars
Battles of the Ottoman–Serbian Wars
Medieval Transylvania
Battles involving Wallachia
Battles involving Transylvania
History of Alba County
1479 in the Ottoman Empire
Conflicts in 1479